Danarto (27 June 1941 in Sragen, Central Java – 10 April 2018, Jakarta) was an Indonesian writer and artist. His father was Jakio Harjodinomo, a sugar factory foreman. His mother, named Siti Aminah, was small batik trader in the market. His work is well known; especially  a collection of short stories: Godlob. In 2009 Danarto accepted the Ahmad Bakrie Award for literature.

Life
After completing his education at the elementary school (SD) and junior high school (SMP), he continued his schooling in literature at the secondary school (SMA) in Solo. 
In 1958–1961 he studied at the Indonesian Institute of the Arts, Yogyakarta (ASRI) majoring in Art. During this period, he also edited the children's magazine, Si Kuncung. Until 1964, he was a member of the art and drama group "Sanggarbambu" (Bamboo Monastery). 
In 1969–1974 he worked at the arts center Jakarta (Taman Ismail Marzuki). In 1973 he became a lecturer at the Academy of Fine Arts LPKJ (now IKJ) Jakarta.
He was the chief designer for the Indonesian cultural group that visited Osaka, Japan, for Expo '70. During 1978, he toured Europe and Asia with a theatrical troupe, led by the choreographer and director Sardono, acting and designing sets. In 1988, he received the S.E.A. Write Award.
In later years, he has worked as a theatrical director in Jakarta. He died on 10 April 2018 at the age of 76.

Publications

References

1941 births
2018 deaths
Indonesian writers
Javanese people
International Writing Program alumni
People from Sragen Regency